Anna Shternshis is an Al and Malka Green Professor of Yiddish studies and the director of the Anne Tanenbaum Centre for Jewish Studies at the University of Toronto. Her research interests include Jewish culture in the Soviet Union; Jewish-Slavic cultural relations; Yiddish mass culture, theatre, and music.

She received her M.A. degree from Russian State University for the Humanities and Ph.D. degree in Modern Languages and Literatures from Oxford University in 2001.

Shternshis is the author of two books, as well as over 20 articles  and book chapters. She is the co-editor-in-chief of East European Jewish Affairs.

Shternshis together with composer/performer and slavist Psoy Korolenko created and directed Yiddish Glory, a project to release the forgotten Yiddish songs written during the Holocaust in the Soviet Union. It was nominated and shortlisted for the 61st Annual Grammy Award in the world music category.

Books
Soviet and Kosher: Jewish Popular Culture in the Soviet Union, 1923–1939, Bloomington, Indiana University Press, 2006
When Sonia Met Boris: An Oral History of Jewish Life under Stalin, New York, Oxford University Press, 2017

References

Year of birth missing (living people)
Living people
Academic staff of the University of Toronto
Alumni of the University of Oxford
Russian State University for the Humanities alumni
Canadian women academics
Jewish Canadian sociologists
Canadian women sociologists
Canadian sociologists